Science was launched at Scarborough in 1829. On 20 September Captain J. Saunders sailed her from England for Mauritius under a license from the British East India Company. On 9 September 1831 Captain W. Saunders sailed her from Britain to Van Diemen's Land. She sailed from Hobart in May 1832.

Her crew set her on fire and abandoned her. The American South Sea whaler  rescued the crew. Science was on a voyage from Van Diemen's Land to London.

Notes, citations, and references
Notes

Citations

References

1829 ships
Age of Sail merchant ships of England
Maritime incidents in June 1832